was an Okinawan martial arts master who is notable for aiding in the evolution of Shōrin-ryū karate. Early in his childhood, he became a student of the renowned master Matsumura Sōkon, of the Shuri-te style. In addition to being a recognized expert in martial arts, Chomo was the first to formally use the kanji kara (空) instead of "to" or "tang" (唐), a term by which Okinawa's martial art became known: "karate".

Biography
Hanashiro Chomo was born in Shuri. He started karate practice at a very young age with Itosu Ankō (1830–1915) under the auspices of Sōkon Matsumura (1809–1896). Itosu Anko was the oldest disciple. Sokon was already in advanced age. Chomo quickly became his assistant and remained so until his master's death in 1915. Sokon bequeathed it to his successor Anko Itosu, under whom Hanashiro continued his martial learning. Unlike Matsumura, Itosu aimed to promote karate as a modality of physical and social development in the public school system of Okinawa, influenced by Hanashiro.

Chomo was the very first person to use the term "karate" in his personal writings dating from 1905. He voluntarily replaced the old ideogram of to/tang (唐), by that of kara (空), because of their phonetic similarity, to slightly modify the meaning of the term. Kara-te = “empty” hand, means in the sense of emptiness in Zen Buddhism. On October 25, 1936, Chomo also participated with Kentsu Yabu, in the assembly of the “Great Masters of Okinawa Karate”, where he advocated and obtained the official adoption of the term “Karate” (“Empty Hand”).

In the early quarter of the twentieth century, Chomo was recognized as a great expert in karate, still pioneering the teaching of martial art in the indigenous educational system in Okinawa. In addition to the technical contributions, the use of the word «karate» was used to describe his martial art, in the 1905 publication «Karate Kumite», when he formally abandoned the use of kanji (唐) by (空). Both may sound like "tang", but the latter also means empty and leaves the reference to the Sinic Dynasty somewhat more distant.

Another notable event in his life: while in Tokyo in 1936, with his fellow student and lifelong friend, Kentsu Yabu (1863–1937), he visited Shōshin Nagamine, then a student at the police school, to order him to respect the katas in their original form, unlike what he had seen in local dōjōs, where the taught katas were so altered that they had little in common. Shōshin Nagamine taught the original katas to the end. Gichin Funakoshi (the founder of Shotokan), his former fellow student at Itosu Ankō, hastened to imitate him.

Chomo died in 1945, during World War II bombardments of the American military on Okinawa. These bombings caused 60,000 civilian casualties in 82 days.

His most eminent disciples were Shigeru Nakamura (1892–1969), Chitōse (1898–1984), (founder of Chitō-ryū, not to be confused with Kenwa Mabuni's Shitō-ryū), Nakama Chōzo (1899–1982), who later became a disciple of Choshin Chibana, Shimabukuro Zenryō (1904–1969), founder of the Shōrin-ryū Seibukan"Seibukan Shōrin-ryū school) and Kinjō Hiroshi (1919–2013).

References

1869 births
1945 deaths
Okinawan male karateka
Japanese civilians killed in World War II
Shōrin-ryū practitioners